What Matters Most is the thirty-third studio album by American singer Barbra Streisand released on August 23, 2011 by Columbia Records. Dedicated to the lyrics of her longtime friends Alan and Marilyn Bergman, the album was produced by Streisand herself. No singles were released to promote the album; it debuted at number 4 on the Billboard 200, and received generally positive reviews from music critics. 

Having recorded numerous Bergman songs during her career, Streisand planned What Matters Most as a chance to mine other gems from their extensive songbook. The deluxe edition includes a second disc containing the Bergman tunes that Streisand had previously recorded.

At the 54th Grammy Awards What Matters Most was nominated for Best Traditional Pop Vocal Album. In its first week the album sold 68,000 copies in the United States, and 210,000 copies within a year. The album became her fourth studio album not to receive a certification from RIAA Certification in the United States.

A Happening at Starbucks
In promotion of the album, Streisand's February performance at the MusiCares Person of the Year benefit was made available to view on the Starbucks Digital Network between August 23 and 30, 2011.

Track listing
All lyrics by Alan and Marilyn Bergman, except "That Face", lyrics by Alan Bergman and Lew Spence. Composers indicated.

Chart performance

Weekly charts

Year-end charts

References

External links 
 Barbra Archives: What Matters Most (2011)
 

2011 albums
Barbra Streisand albums
Columbia Records albums